Bridget is a feminine given name.

Bridget may also refer to:

 Bridget (Guilty Gear), a fictional character in the fighting game series Guilty Gear
 Bridget (horse), a racehorse

See also 
Brigid or Brighid
Bridgit (disambiguation)
Brigitte (disambiguation)
Saint Birgitta of Sweden